The Birthday Party is a 1985 live video by Motörhead. It features the band's 10th anniversary show at the Hammersmith Odeon in London, England. During the performance of "Motörhead" the band were joined onstage by all of the past members (with the exception of Larry Wallis, who appeared at the first of the two anniversary shows but not at the second, which was when the concert was recorded), and Thin Lizzy bassist Phil Lynott.

It was also released in CD format in 1990 by Enigma Records, albeit with an edited track listing and running order. A DVD reissue was published on 2007 by SRP.

Track listing

Credits

Band
 Lemmy - bass guitar, vocals
 Phil Campbell - guitar
 Würzel - guitar
 Pete Gill - drums

Guests:
 "Fast" Eddie Clarke - guitar ("Motörhead")
 Brian "Robbo" Robertson - guitar ("Motörhead")
  Phil "Philthy Animal" Taylor - drums ("Motörhead")
 Lucas Fox - playing guitar, not drums ("Motörhead")
 Phil Lynott - bass guitar ("Motörhead")
 Wendy O. Williams - vocals on "No Class"

Motörhead video albums
Live video albums
1985 live albums
1985 video albums